Ko Young-Hoon (born 1952) is a South Korean painter.

Biography
Ko was born in 1952, on Jeju Island, and graduated from Hongik University. He lives and works in Seoul. His work is known for its hyperrealism that invokes trompe-l'œil.

Art
By representing objects with their most minute details, Ko, in the line of Magritte, questions our beliefs in authenticity and objectivity. But if his work clearly draws on Western influences, it is also the product of an almost mystical reflexion on traditional Korean aesthetic values and on the concepts of nothingness (mu 無) and existence (yu 有).

His work can be considered pertaining to both Hyperrealism and Surrealism. The critic Gérard Xuriguera says of his series Stonebook: "Combining in his painting lettered messages and their relation to stones, he positions them within the pages of an open book or imposed on newspapers, strangely gravity-free, in a way that creates contrasts in tension, modifying the sense of the displaced objects. This creates a sort of wakened dream, never broken from natural ebbs, in which reality and illusion combine."

Selected art exhibitions
 Solo exhibitions at Total Art Museum and Gana Art Center, Seoul
 42nd Venice Biennale (1986)
 Public collections, including the National Museum of Contemporary Art and the Ho-Am Art Museum, South Korea
 Detroit Institute of Arts
 Musée de Luneville, France
 Queen Beatrix Collection, Amsterdam
 Yokohama Business Park, Japan
 Three of his works were recently displayed in the Paris group show exhibition "Vide et Plein", displaying the work of 10 Asian artists, organized by Paris-based Maison Bleu Studio.

References

1952 births
Living people
Hongik University alumni
People from Jeju Province
South Korean painters